Crinum is a genus of about 180 species of perennial plants that have large showy flowers on leafless stems, and develop from bulbs. They are found in seasonally moist areas, including marshes, swamps, depressions and along the sides of streams and lakes in tropical and subtropical areas worldwide.

Description

Crinum leaves are basal, typically long and strap-shaped, with colors ranging from light green to green.

Cytological studies have shown some 27 species of Crinum to be diploid with a normal chromosome count of 2n = 22. Abilio Fernandes found that the Orange River Crinum bulbispermum had a count of 2n = 66, and some desert Crinum macowanii 2n = 44. These polyploid species produce seeds that are often parthenogenetic triploid or diploids, lack vigour and seldom grow to mature plants.

Taxonomy

, the World Checklist of Selected Plant Families lists 105 species of Crinum. Amongst these are:

Crinum americanum L. – southern swamplily, seven sisters
Crinum asiaticum L. – poisonbulb
Crinum bulbispermum (Burm.f.) Milne-Redh. & Schweick. – hardy swamplily
Crinum latifolium L.
Crinum macowanii Baker
Crinum moorei Hook.f.
Crinum pedunculatum R.Br., syn. C. asiaticum var. pedunculatum – swamplily, river lily or spider lily
Crinum thaianum Schulze  – onion plant
Crinum viviparum (Lam.) R.Ansari & V.J.Nair – Indian Subcontinent to Indo-China

Formerly placed here
Agapanthus africanus (L.) Hoffmanns. (as C. africanum L.)
Ammocharis heterostyla (Bullock) Milne-Redh. & Schweick. (as C. heterostylum Bullock)
Cyrtanthus angustifolius (L.f.) Aiton (as C. angustifolius L.f.)
Cyrtanthus elatus (Jacq.) Traub (as C. speciosum L.f.)
Cyrtanthus obliquus (L.f.) Aiton (as C. obliquum L.f.)
Hippeastrum argentinum (Pax) Hunz. (as C. argentinum Pax)
Urceolina urceolata (Ruiz & Pav.) Asch. & Graebn. (as C. urceolatum Ruiz & Pav.)

Hybrids 
× Amarcrinum hybridised with Amaryllis
C. × powellii (garden hybrid between C. bulbispermum and C. moorei) - pale pink, fragrant, lily-like flowers produced in late summer
C. × powellii 'Album' (white flowered cultivar)

Uses
Several species are used in aquariums and in aquascaping. These include Crinum calamistratum, Crinum malabaricum, Crinum natans, and Crinum thaianum.

Gallery

See also

 List of plants known as lily

References

Bibliography 

  (online version)

External links

 Pacific Bulb Society Crinum Page, includes links to photographs
 Crinums In East Texas: Notes From Marcelle Sheppard, includes links to photographs, cultural information, and hybridizing results
 Bulbsociety
 The Genus Crinum
 African Crinums
 Bulb Society
 Juniper Level Botanic Garden Crinum Photo Gallery

 
Amaryllidaceae genera
Pantropical flora